Nomikos Michael Vaporis (1926–1997) was an historian of the Byzantine Empire and Modern Greek Hellenism at Hellenic College/Holy Cross Greek Orthodox School of Theology in Brookline, Massachusetts, United States. He also served as Dean of Hellenic College (1975–1985), Acting Dean of Holy Cross (1977), Acting Dean of Hellenic College (1993) and Interim Dean, Holy Cross (1993–1995). His other positions included: Director of Holy Cross Orthodox Press (1976–1995), Editor of the Greek Orthodox Theological Review (1972–1995), and Founder and Co-editor of the Journal of Modern Hellenism (1984–1997). During his career he also worked for interfaith dialogue, participating in peace missions, and organizing conferences and publishing academic works on the subject.

Life

Nomikos Michael was born in Kalymnos, Greece, on 20 July 1926, emigrated to the United States at the age of three, and grew up in Campbell, OH. He was ordained to the diaconate in March 1954 and to the priesthood in May 1954. He received the rank Protopresbyter of the Ecumenical Patriarchate in 1979.

He is a graduate of Youngstown State College (B.A.); Holy Cross Orthodox School of Theology (Dipl. In Theology); Berkeley Divinity School (Yale Divinity School) (S.T.B., S.T.M.); School of Theology, University of Athens (Greece Lic. Theology); Columbia University (M.A., Ph.D. in Byzantine and Eastern European History). His dissertation research was conducted in Greece and Istanbul, Turkey (1964-1965), under the auspices of a Fulbright Award. He was a member of numerous of professional organizations, including: Modern Greek Studies Association; Orthodox Theological Society of America; Byzantine Society of the U.S.A.; Byzantine Studies Conference (also as a member of the governing board), Holy Cross Alumni Association; St. Andrew's Clergymen's Brotherhood.

At Hellenic College/Holy Cross, Vaporis taught the History of the Ecumenical Patriarchate, Byzantine History, History of Modern Hellenism, History of Greece, History of the Balkans, Byzantine and Slavic Church History, and Lives of the Saints.

Vaporis worked to advance interfaith dialogue, participating in a Middle East Peace Mission to Geneva, Athens, Istanbul, Jerusalem, and Beirut organized by the Baptist Church (1973), organizing a conference on Byzantium and Islam (1980). He served on various interfaith bodies, including (Jewish) Reformed-Orthodox Consultation, Roman Catholic-Orthodox Consultation, Anglical-Orthodox Consultation, and Southern Baptist-Orthodox Consultation.

Vaporis wrote a book, Witnesses for Christ: Orthodox Christian Neomartyrs of the Ottoman Period, 1437-1860, which was published after his death. The book was the subject of a review in The Catholic Historical Review.

Parish service in the Greek Orthodox Archdiocese of America
Rev. Nomikos Michael Vaporis served the following parishes of the Greek Orthodox Archdiocese:
Holy Cross Greek Orthodox Church, Mount Lebanon (Pittsburgh, PA), 1954-1960
Three Hierarchs, Brooklyn NY (1960-1961)
Evangelismos, Easton, PA (1961-1964)
St. Athanasios, Arlington, MA (1965-1966)
Assumption, Somersworth, NH (1967–80)
Annunciation, Woburn, MA (Interim) (1989)
St. George, Lynn, MA (Interim)

Publications
Some Aspects of the History of the Ecumenical Patriarchate on Constantinople in the Seventeenth and Eighteenth Centuries (The Archbishop Iakovos Library of Ecclesiastical and Historical Sources, No. 1). Brookline, MA: Holy Cross Orthodox Press, 1969.
Codex Gamma of the Ecumenical Patriarchate (The Archbishop Iakovos Library of Ecclesiastical and Historical Sources, No. 2). Brookline, MA: Holy Cross Orthodox Press, 1976.
Father Kosmas the Apostle to the Poor (The Archbishop Iakovos Library of Ecclesiastical and Historical Sources, No. 4). Brookline MA: Holy Cross Orthodox Press, 1977.
Codex Beta of the Ecumenical Patriarchate (The Archbishop Iakovos Library of Ecclesiastical and Historical Sources, No. 3). Brookline, MA: Holy Cross Orthodox Press, 1977.
Daily Prayers for Orthodox Christians: The Synekdemos. Brookline, MA: Holy Cross Orthodox Press, 1977.
The Divine Liturgy of St. John Chrysostom (with A. Calivas, T. Stylianopoulos, T. FitzGerald, and P. Chamberas). Brookline, MA: Holy Cross Orthodox Press, 1985: 5th printing
The Trisagion Service. Brookline, MA: Holy Cross Orthodox Press, 1986.
The Divine Liturgy of St. Iakovos. Brookline, MA: Holy Cross Orthodox Press, 1988.
The Order of the Divine and Holy Liturgy. Brookline, MA: Holy Cross Orthodox Press, 1987.
The Divine Liturgy of St. Basil. Brookline, MA: Holy Cross Orthodox Press, 1988.
A Chronicle of Hellenic College/Holy Cross. Brookline, MA: Holy Cross Orthodox Press, 1988.
The Service of the Akathist Hymn and Small Compline (with Serapheim Dedes). Brookline, MA: Holy Cross Orthodox Press, 1991.
The Service of Saturday Vespers.'. Brookline, MA: Holy Cross Orthodox Press, 1992.The Service of the Akathist Hymn and Small Compline (with Dr. Evie Holmberg). Brookline, MA: Holy Cross Orthodox Press, 1992.The Services for Holy Week and Easter Sunday. Brookline, MA: Holy Cross Orthodox Press, 1993.The Service of the Sunday Orthros. Brookline, MA: Holy Cross Orthodox Press, 1991.Translating the Scriptures into Modern Greece. Brookline, MA: Holy Cross Orthodox Press, 1994.Witnesses for Christ. Orthodox Christian Neomartyrs of the Ottoman Period 1487-1860. St. Vladimir's Seminary Press, 2000.For a review of this book, see for  Charles A. Frazee, The Catholic Historical Review 87, 3 (Jul., 2001): 475-476.

Other publications

Vaporis also published more than thirty articles in various journals, including: “A Defender of the Faith: Nektarios Terpos. A Case Study,” in Demetrios Constantelos (ed.), Orthodox Theology and Diakonia, pp. 145–154, Brookline, 1981; “Some Unlikely Forerunners of the Greek Revolution.” Journal of Modern Hellenism 9 (1992): 111–125.

As editor, Nomikos Michael Vaporis produced no fewer than fifteen volumes, including The Holy Gospel (Brookline, 1976), Byzantine Ecclesiastical Personalities (Brookline, 1975); An Orthodox Prayer Book (Brookline, 1977); Three Byzantine Sacred Poets (Brookline, 1979); The Apostles (Brookline 1980); The Divine Liturgy of St. John Chrysostom. Four Languages edition (Brookline, 1983); The Divine Liturgy, Episcopal edition (Brookline, 1989); A Guide to the Services (Brookline, 1988); The Holy Gospel. Complete Edition. Brookline, 1994; Christian Faith Facing Science, Education, Politics (Brookline, 1994). The Holy Gospel and The Divine Liturgy are used widely in Greek Orthodox parishes across the United States.

"Orthodox Christians and Muslims" (1986) was a particularly notable publication, the result of an interfaith conference he organized at Hellenic College/Holy Cross School of Theology in March 1985.

References

External links 
 Contributions by Nomikos Michael Vaporis on goarch.org

1926 births
20th-century American historians
20th-century American male writers
1997 deaths
American male non-fiction writers